EUL may refer to:

 Caldwell Industrial Airport, in Idaho, United States
 Federation of Estonian Student Unions
 Emergency Use Listing, see World Health Organization's response to the COVID-19 pandemic
 Enhanced Uplink
 Eskom Uganda Limited, a Ugandan energy company
 Estonian Swimming Federation
 European United Left (disambiguation)
 European University of Lefke
 Lisbon University Stadium